As of January 2023, there are 48 Conservation Areas in the Bournemouth, Christchurch and Poole, in Dorset, England.

Conservation areas

References

See also 

 List of conservation areas in England

 List of churches in Bournemouth
 List of churches in Christchurch
 List of churches in Poole

Bournemouth, Christchurch and Poole
Bournemouth,_Christchurch_and_Poole
Bournemouth,_Christchurch_and_Poole